Bernard Borderie (10 June 1924 in Paris – 28 May 1978 in Paris) was a French film director and screenwriter. His father, Raymond Borderie, was one of the producers of Les Enfants du Paradis (Children of Paradise, 1945).

Selected filmography
 Wolves Hunt at Night (1952, based on the novel Le Lieutenant de Gibraltar by Pierre Frondaie)
 La môme vert-de-gris (1953, based on the Lemmy Caution novel Poison Ivy by Peter Cheyney)
 The Women Couldn't Care Less (1954, based on the Lemmy Caution novel Dames Don't Care by Peter Cheyney)
  (1955, based on the novel Fortune carrée by Joseph Kessel)
  (1957)
 Ces dames préfèrent le mambo (1957)
 The Mask of the Gorilla (1958, based on the novel Le Gorille vous salue bien by Antoine Dominique)
  (1959, based on the novel Hit And Run by James Hadley Chase)
 Sergeant X (1960)
 Women Are Like That (1960, based on the Lemmy Caution novel I'll Say She Does by Peter Cheyney)
  (1960, based on the novel Le Grand Caïd by Claude Orval)
 The Three Musketeers (1961, based on the novel The Three Musketeers by Alexandre Dumas)
 Lemmy pour les dames (1962, based on the Lemmy Caution series by Peter Cheyney)
  (1962, based on the Pardaillan series by Michel Zevaco)
  (1963, based on the Rocambole series by Pierre Alexis Ponson du Terrail)
 Your Turn, Darling (1963, based on the Lemmy Caution novel Your Deal, My Lovely by Peter Cheyney)
 Hardi Pardaillan! (1964, based on the Pardaillan series by Michel Zevaco)
 Angélique, Marquise des Anges (1964, based on the novel Angélique, the Marquise of the Angels by Anne Golon)
 Marvelous Angelique (1965, based on the Angélique series by Anne Golon)
 Angelique and the King (1966, based on the novel Angélique and the King by Anne Golon)
 Brigade antigangs (1966, based on a novel by Auguste Le Breton)
 Sept hommes et une garce (1967)
 Untamable Angelique (1967, based on the Angélique series by Anne Golon)
 Angelique and the Sultan (1968, based on the Angélique series by Anne Golon)
  (1969, based on the Catherine series by Juliette Benzoni)
  (1972, based on the novel Abenteuer eines jungen Herrn in Polen by Alexander Lernet-Holenia)
 The Gallant Lords of Bois-Doré (1976, TV miniseries based on the novel Les Beaux Messieurs de Bois-Doré by George Sand)

References

External links

1924 births
1978 deaths
French male screenwriters
20th-century French screenwriters
French film directors
20th-century French male writers